Molybdocene dihydride is the organomolybdenum compound with the formula (η5-C5H5)2MoH2.  Commonly abbreviated as Cp2MoH2, it is a yellow air-sensitive solid that dissolves in some organic solvents.

The compound is prepared by combining molybdenum pentachloride, sodium cyclopentadienide, and sodium borohydride. The dihydride converts to molybdocene dichloride upon treatment with chloroform.

The compound adopts a "clamshell" structure where the Cp rings are not parallel.

References

Metal hydrides
Metallocenes
Organomolybdenum compounds
Cyclopentadienyl complexes
Molybdenum(IV) compounds